Hämeenlinnan Pallokerho (HPK) is a professional ice hockey team in the Liiga, the top men's ice hockey league in Finland. Their home ice is the Ritari-areena in Hämeenlinna. HPK was established in 1929. The parent club of the team is HPK Edustusjääkiekko ry and the team is sometimes promoted as the "Hockey Playing Knights," with a logo representing a knight's helmet. HPK won their first SM-liiga championship in 2006 and the second in 2019.

Honours

Champions
 SM-liiga Kanada-malja (2): 2006, 2019

Runners-up
 SM-liiga (3): 1952, 1993, 2010 
 SM-liiga  (9): 1954, 1991, 1997, 1999, 2000, 2002, 2003, 2005, 2007

Other awards for the club:
  I-Divisioona  (it was the second level of ice hockey in Finland) (5): 1980, 1981, 1982, 1983, 1988

Players

2019-2020

Goalkeepers
1 Tuomas Aalto
35 Antti Karjalainen
60 Rasmus Reijola
83 Joona Voutilainen

Defenders
6 Niklas Friman (C)
10 Atso Lehtinen
25 Roope Laavainen
38 Miro Karjalainen
42 Arto Laatikainen (A)
43 Otto Latvala
44 Paavo Tyni
53 Nico Nurmikanta
63 Elmeri Eronen
74 Petteri Nikkilä (A)

Forwards
14 Mikko Lahtela
15 Santtu Hakanen
16 Jere Jokinen
19 Cody Kunyk
21 Jere Innala
26 Tommi Tikka
27 Filip Krivosik
28 Markus Nenonen (A)
29 Miro Ruokonen
34 Erkka Seppälä
40 Janne Tavi
45 Henri Kanninen
48 Valtteri Puustinen
49 Kasperi Heinänen
51 Philippe Cornet
71 Niclas Lucenius
81 Joona Monto
86 Kristjan Kombe

Honored members
2 Eero Salisma
9 Jyrki Louhi
13 Marko Palo
17 Juha Hietanen
18 Hannu Savolainen
36 Marko Tuulola

NHL alumni

  Eric Fehr
  Riku Hahl
  Jukka Hentunen
  Josh Holden
  Niko Kapanen
  Rostislav Klesla
  Janne Laukkanen
  Ville Leino
  Antti Miettinen
  Pasi Nurminen
  Timo Pärssinen
  Antti Pihlström
  Brian Rafalski
  Karri Rämö
  Geoff Sanderson
  Roman Šimíček
  Ville Sirén
  Juuse Saros
  Petr Tenkrát
  Hannu Toivonen
  Jarkko Varvio
  Tomáš Vlasák
  Kristian Vesalainen

See also 

HPK Kiekkonaiset
Ice hockey in Finland

References

External links

Official website 

Liiga teams
Sport in Hämeenlinna
Sports clubs in Finland
1929 establishments in Finland
Liiga 
Ice hockey clubs established in 1929